Wawu (or perhaps Vavu; Russian transcription Вавуски) is an obscure language formerly spoken in West Africa that has not been classified. The only evidence for this language, assuming it is not spurious, is published in a late 18th-century source that includes two languages called "Wawu", the other being a dialect of Ewe. The consultant for the unclassified language called "Wawu" identified his people's neighbors as the Fra (Kasena), Bente, Naena, Gui, Guraa (Anyi), Guaflee and No (= Nejo, Bete).

Data
A few words of Wawu are recorded.
Numerals are as follows, with  substituted for German .

1 
2 
3 
4 
5 
6 
7 
8 
9 
10 
11 
12 

A sentence has also been recorded:
[Christ] 
'[Christ] loves me, has washed me with blood'

Notes 

Unclassified languages of Africa
Languages attested from the 18th century
Languages extinct in the 19th century